Up & Away may refer to:

 Up & Away (Gregory Douglass album), 2006
 Up & Away (Kid Ink album), 2012
 Up and Away, a 1966 album by The Kingsmen